Revelations: The Pale EP is the third in a series of four EPs that make up Revelations, the fifth studio album by William Control.  The other three EPs are The Pale, The Black and The White, after the Four Horsemen of the Apocalypse.  It was released by Control Records on July 14, 2017 and peaked at 179 on the Billboard 200 chart, at number 5 on the Billboard Dance/Electronic Albums chart, and at number one on the Heatseekerschart.  A video for Let Her Go was released on September 6, 2017.

The EP was recorded at Control's Hell's Half Acre studio and was produced and engineered by Kenneth Fletcher, and engineered and mixed by Axel Otero of the band Lay Your Ghost.  It was mastered by John Troxell.  Fans were invited down to the Control Merch shop to record gang vocals.

Track listing

Personnel
All credits adapted from liner notes.

 Kenneth Fletcher – producer, engineer, artwork, layout
 Axel Otero – engineer, mixing
 John Troxell – mastering

Charts

References

2017 EPs
William Control albums
Control Records albums
Synth-pop EPs
Dark wave EPs